Renala Khurd (Punjabi) is a growing city in the Okara District in the northeast Punjab province of Pakistan. Khurd is a Persian word meaning small.

The city is the headquarters of Renala Khurd Tehsil, an administrative subdivision of the district.

It is southwest of Lahore on the national highway (GT Road) and on the Lahore Karachi main railway line. Renala Khurd operates on PKT.

Literal meaning of Renala is "Mother of Forests". Renala Khurd is very famous for its gardens, forests and fruit farms. 

Khurd is attributed to Small.

Demographics

With a radius of 7 km, it is home to over 100,000 inhabitants. The population of Renala Khurd is over 99% Muslim. It has a Sunni majority and a Shia minority; there are also small groups of Christians.
Due to its strategic location in the Indian sub-continent, many migrants have poured into the area and settled on its fertile lands. The people of Renala Khurd are descendants of Iranians, Turks, Afghans and Arabs who came individually or in groups.

University of Okara

The University of Okara, previously known as the University of Education Okara campus, is 1 km west of the city. It was inaugurated in 2005 by then Prime Minister Shaukat Aziz.

Notable residents
Liaquat Ali (born 1983), athlete
Rizwan Haider (born 1985), cricketer, 
Abdur Rauf (born 1978), cricketer

Languages
Haryanavi, Punjabi, Ranghari and Urdu are basic languages of the people.

References

Populated places established in 1914
Cities and towns in Okara District